USS Mindoro (CVE-120) was a  launched during World War II, but was completed too late to see active service. After service in the Caribbean, Atlantic and the Mediterranean during the early Cold War, the carrier was stricken from the Navy List on 1 December 1959 and scrapped.

Description and construction
She had a complement of 1,066.

Mindoro was laid down by Todd-Pacific Shipyards, Inc., in Tacoma, Washington on 2 January 1945, and launched on 27 June 1945. She was sponsored by Mrs. R. L. Bowman, and commissioned at Tacoma on 4 December 1945, with Captain Edwin R. Peck in command. The ship was nicknamed the "Mighty Minnie".

Service history

After her shakedown cruise along the West Coast, Mindoro sailed for the East Coast late in January 1946 and arrived Norfolk, Virginia, on 15 February. Assigned to Carrier Division 14, she began carrier air training operations along the East Coast. In May she joined ships of the 8th Fleet for exercises in waters of the West Indies. During the remainder of the year, she ranged the Atlantic from New England to Cuba, training naval aviators and taking part in anti-submarine Hunter killer exercises.

As the nation underwent a general demobilization, Mindoro continued to carry out a busy schedule of training and readiness operations. During the next nine years she operated out of Norfolk. Her numerous type training and fleet exercises sent her the length of the eastern coast of North America from Davis Strait to the Caribbean, and across the Atlantic to the British Isles and the Mediterranean. In 1950 and again in 1954, she deployed to the Mediterranean where she bolstered the forces of the 6th Fleet.

After completing exercises off the Virginia Capes, Mindoro steamed to Boston on 17 January 1955. She decommissioned at Boston on 4 August 1955 and joined the Atlantic Reserve Fleet. While berthed at Boston, she was reclassified as AKV‑20 on 7 May 1959. Later that year, she was authorized for disposal, and her name was struck from the Navy List on 1 December. Subsequently, she was disposed of in June 1960 and scrapped at Hong Kong later that year.

Notes

References

External links

Photo gallery at navsource.org

 

Commencement Bay-class escort carriers
Cold War aircraft carriers of the United States
1945 ships